Austrian Development Cooperation is a program of the government of Austria that supports countries in Africa, Asia, South-Eastern and Eastern Europe, and the Caribbean.

Austrian official development assistance (ODA)

Actors
Development cooperation in Austria is a task for the whole of government, which is why alongside the Federal Ministry of Finance and the Federal Ministry for Europe, Integration and Foreign Affairs other federal ministries, the federal states and municipalities and the Oesterreichische Entwicklungsbank (Austrian Development Bank) also contribute to official development assistance (ODA). Austria reports these contributions to the Organisation for Economic Co-operation and Development (OECD). Its Development Assistance Committee (DAC) then decides which payments are actually eligible to count as ODA.

The legal basis for Austrian Development Cooperation is the Federal Development Cooperation Act (DCA) adopted in 2002 and amended in 2003. It contains a specific list of objectives that prescribes development-policy criteria for the whole of the federal administration. The central development-policy positions and strategic framework are defined in the Three-Year-Programme on Austrian Development Policy, which is updated annually under the auspices of FMEIA. Above all, it provides the Austrian Development Agency (ADA) with the basis for implementing bilateral programmes and projects.

References and notes

External links 
 entwicklung.at - Homepage of the Austrian Development Cooperation

Government of Austria
Foreign relations of Austria